mix age* moritaka chisato rare tracks and remixes is a remix album by Japanese singer/songwriter Chisato Moritaka, released on November 3, 1999 after her marriage to actor Yōsuke Eguchi on June 3 and her subsequent retirement from the music industry. The album features a selection of remixes of Moritaka's past hits.

The album peaked at No. 30 on Oricon's albums chart and sold over 15,000 copies.

Track listing 
All lyrics are written by Chisato Moritaka; all music is arranged by Yuichi Takahashi, except where indicated.

Personnel 
 Chisato Moritaka – vocals, loop drums (all tracks except 8 & 10), drums (10)
 Yuichi Takahashi – guitar (1, 4, 10, 12), synthesizer programming (1–4, 6–7, 9, 10, 12), backing vocals (10)
 Yukio Seto – guitar (2–4, 6, 8, 12), bass (4), wind chimes (4, 8), cowbell (4)
 Yasuaki Maejima – piano (4, 8), Fender Rhodes (5), keyboards (5), synthesizer programming (5)
 David T. Walker – guitar (5)
 Shin Kōno – piano (10)
 Masafumi Yokoyama – bass (10)

Charts

References

External links 
  (Chisato Moritaka)
  (Up-Front Works)
 
 

1999 remix albums
Chisato Moritaka compilation albums
Japanese-language compilation albums
Zetima compilation albums